Befol may refer to:

 Befol, a brand name pharmaceutical product containing diclofenac and pridinol
 Befol, a synonym for the antidepressant eprobemide

References